Madame Bovary is a British period television series, based on the novel of the same title by Gustave Flaubert. It originally aired in four episodes on BBC 2 in 1975.

Cast
 Francesca Annis as Emma Bovary
 Tom Conti as Charles Bovary
 Gabrielle Lloyd as Felicite
 Ray Smith as Homais
 Brian Stirner as Leon Dupuis
 David Waller as Father Bournisien
 John Cater as Lheureux
 Kathleen Helme as Madame Bovary, Charles' mother
 Ivor Roberts as Guillaumin 
 Stephen Bent as Justin
 Denis Lill as Rodolphe Boulanger
 Michael Poole as Dr. Canivet
 Bernard Taylor as Girard
 John Tordoff as Hippolyte
 Richard Beale as M. Rouault
 James Bree as Beadle
 Antony Carrick as Clerk
 Ysanne Churchman as Heloise
 Oliver Gilbert as Guest at ball
 Amanda Grinling as Madame Homais
 Nicola Hamilton as Guest at ball
 Nicholas Hawtrey as Vicomte
 Jack Le White as Louis
 Elizabeth Proud as Nastasie
 Peter Rutherford as Guest at ball
 Mike Savage as Bertrand 
 Gladys Spencer as Guest at ball
 John Sterland as Lieuvain
 William Thomas as Albert

References

Bibliography
 Roberts, Jerry. Encyclopedia of Television Film Directors. Scarecrow Press, 2009.

External links
 

BBC television dramas
1975 British television series debuts
1975 British television series endings
English-language television shows
Television shows based on French novels
Television series set in the 19th century
Television shows set in France
Adaptations of works by Gustave Flaubert